Kharitonov, or Kharitonova (feminine; Харито́нова) is a Russian surname that is derived from the male given name Khariton and literally means Khariton's. Notable people with the surname include:

 Aleksandr Kharitonov (chess player), (born 1986), Russian chess player
 Aleksandr Kharitonov (footballer) (born 1983), Russian footballer
 Aleksandr Kharitonov (ice hockey) (born 1976), Russian ice hockey player
 Andrei Kharitonov, a Ukrainian actor and film director 
 Dmitry Evstratievich Kharitonov (1896–1970), a Russian arachnologist
 Gavriil Kharitonov (1767–?), Russian copperplate engraver
 Leonid Kharitonov (actor) (1930–1987), Soviet actor
 Leonid Kharitonov (singer) (1933-2017), Soviet bass soloist with the Alexandrov Ensemble, and operatic and concert soloist
 Mark Kharitonov (born 1937), writer and translator
 Mikhail Kharitonov (?–?), associate of Stepan Razin
 Nikolai Kharitonov (1920–1988), Soviet aircraft pilot and Hero of the Soviet Union
 Nikolay Kharitonov (born 1948), Russian politician 
 Oleg Kharitonov, 100 mile track world record holder
 Pyotr Kharitonov (1916–1987), Soviet aircraft pilot and Hero of the Soviet Union
 Sergei Kharitonov (born 1980), Russian heavyweight mixed martial arts fighter
 Vladimir Kharitonov, Soviet poet
 Vladimir Kharitonov (1919–1996), Soviet aircraft pilot and Hero of the Soviet Union
 Vladimir Leonidovich Kharitonov, Russian mathematician, see Kharitonov's theorem
 Yevgeny Kharitonov (politician), Russian politician
 Yevgeny Kharitonov (poet), Russian poet
Anna Kharitonova (born 1985), Russian judoka
Marta Kharitonova (born 1984), Russian slalom canoer
Olga Kharitonova (born 1990), Russian sprinter
Svetlana Kharitonova (1932–2012), Russian actress

Russian-language surnames